Agfa most often refers to Agfa-Gevaert, an imaging technologies company listed on the Euronext stock exchange.

Agfa may also refer to:

 Agfa (nematode), a genus of nematode in the family Agfidae
 AgfaPhoto, a defunct photographic products company, now used as a licensed brand
 American Genre Film Archive, American non-profit that collects, preserves and distributes films; for example, Take It Out in Trade

See also